Washington Square is a neighborhood in Pasadena, California. It is bordered by Washington Boulevard to the north, Mountain Street to the south, El Molino Avenue to the west, and Lake Avenue to the east. It is notable for having been renamed several times, having been known as part of Orange Heights until the 1950s; in the 1980s it was renamed CLEM (short for Claremont, Lake, El Molino, and Mountain; the streets then encompassing the official area), then Heather Heights until the late 1990s when it was given its current name. The neighborhood was built up gradually until the 1940s, when the last housing tract was built around Heather Square.

History
The land that became Washington Square was a large open field that eventually got replaced by a patchwork of small olive and orange groves. The glen at the corner of Washington and El Molino was used as a municipal dump until 1922, when Theodore Payne reclaimed the land for a park (present-day Washington Park). This helped spur neighborhood development. By 1930, all but the Jonathan Tract (Heather Square) had been filled in. The west-central area of the neighborhood remained undeveloped until 1943.

Over the 1970s and 1980s, property values in the neighborhood plummeted. Gang violence and drug manufacturing became rampant, and historic buildings were demolished in favor of low-rent apartments and cheap shopping centers. The Great Recession followed a 20-year-long wave of gentrification and the neighborhood quickly fell into disrepair, struggling with safety and vacancy.

To combat this issue, In 2003 residents joined together to form the Washington Square Neighborhood Association successfully reducing crime and establishing Washington Square as a historic Pasadena landmark district encompassing approximately 250 homes built mainly between 1910 and 1940. Architectural styles range from California Craftsman, Spanish Colonial, Tudor, English Cottage to Traditional. Streets are lined with old-growth Camphor, California Oak and Palm trees which not only add beauty to the neighborhood but also keeps homes cool during the warm California summers. All contributing properties are eligible for the Mills Act which gives homeowners a substantial real estate tax savings for maintaining their historic home.

Landmarks
Washington Square is notable for having one of Pasadena's oldest parks, Washington Park, which was reclaimed from a municipal dump in 1922. Woodbury Creek also runs through the neighborhood, though most of the creek now runs underground. The neighborhood is also home to two of Pasadena's oldest standing houses, which date from the early 1890s, and the one-time home of author Upton Sinclair (it is believed that the house belonged to him during his run for Governor of California.

Education
Washington Square is served by Marshall Secondary School, Longfellow Elementary School, Eliot Middle School, and John Muir High School.

Transportation
Washington Square is served by Metro Local lines 256 and 662; as well as Pasadena ARTS routes 20, 31 and 32.

Major Streets
Lake Avenue
Washington Boulevard

Neighborhoods in Pasadena, California